Taihe is a town under the administration of Nanfeng County, Jiangxi, China. , it has one residential community and 10 villages under its administration.

Administrative divisions 
Taihe administers the following villages and communities:

Communities
 Taihe Community

Villages
 Taihe Village
 Dianqian Village
 Xiayang Village
 Danyang Village
 Kangdu Village
 Zhangfang Village
 Xiatong Village
 Siqian Village
 Hangshan Village
 Qianfang Village

References 

Township-level divisions of Jiangxi
Nanfeng County